Rock Creek Township is one of twelve townships in Huntington County, Indiana, United States. As of the 2020 census, its population was 1,272.

History
Rock Creek Township was organized in 1842. It was named from Rock Creek, in the eastern part.

Geography

Cities and towns
 Markle (southwest half)

Unincorporated towns
 Browns Corner
 Plum Tree
 Rock Creek Center
(This list is based on USGS data and may include former settlements.)

Adjacent townships
 Union Township (north)
 Union Township, Wells County (northeast)
 Rockcreek Township, Wells County (east)
 Liberty Township, Wells County (southeast)
 Salamonie Township (south)
 Jefferson Township (southwest)
 Lancaster Township (west)
 Huntington Township (northwest)

Cemeteries
The township contains three cemeteries: Barnes, Star of Hope and Yankeetown.

Major highways
  Interstate 69
  U.S. Route 224
  State Road 3
  State Road 5
  State Road 116

Demographics

References
 U.S. Board on Geographic Names (GNIS)
 United States Census Bureau cartographic boundary files

External links
 Indiana Township Association
 United Township Association of Indiana

Townships in Huntington County, Indiana
Townships in Indiana